The second Jacobs cabinet is the 10th cabinet of Sint Maarten. It was installed by Governor Eugene Holiday on 28 March 2020.

Formation of the cabinet began after the 2020 Sint Maarten general elections held on 9 January 2020.

Composition 
The cabinet is composed as follows:

|Prime Minister
|Silveria Jacobs
|NA
|28 March 2020
|-
|Minister of Public Housing, Spatial Planning, Environment and Infrastructure
|Egbert Doran
|NA
|28 March 2020
|-
|Minister of Finance
|Ardwell Irion
|NA
|28 March 2020
|-
|Minister of Justice
|Anna Richardson
|NA
|28 March 2020
|-
|Minister of Education, Culture, Youth, and Sports
|Rodolphe Samuel
|NA
|28 March 2020
|-
|Minister of Tourism, Economic Affairs, Transport and Telecommunications
|Ludmila de Weever
|UP
|28 March 2020
|-
|Minister of Public Health, Social Development and Labour
|Richard Panneflek
|UP
|28 March 2020
|-
|Minister Plenipotentiary of Sint Maarten
|Rene Violenes
|NA
|28 March 2020
|}

References 

Jacobs
Jacobs
Jacobs
Jacobs